FIA is the Fédération Internationale de l'Automobile (English: International Automobile Federation), the world's governing body for all forms of motor sport where four or more wheels are used.

Fia or FIA may also refer to:

People 

 Fia Backström (born 1970), Swedish artist
 Albert Fia (1915–2004), Canadian engineer
 Maʻafu Fia (born 1989), Tongan-born New Zealand rugby union player

Organizations 
 Federal Investigation Agency, the chief investigative body of the Government of Pakistan
 Federated Ironworkers' Association of Australia
 Fellow of the Institute of Actuaries, member of a professional association in the United Kingdom
 FIA Card Services, formerly MBNA Corporation
 Fire Industry Association, trade association in the United Kingdom
 Fiscal Information Agency, government agency in Taiwan
 Friends in Action, American Christian organization
 Future Imagery Architecture, program of the United States National Reconnaissance Office
 Futures Industry Association, trade association in the United States
 International Federation of Actors (Federation Internationale des Acteurs), global union federation
 Free Iraqi Army

Other uses 

 Aechmea 'Fia', hybrid bromeliad cultivar
 Farnborough International Airshow, in England
 Feline infectious anemia, disease found in felines
 Flow injection analysis, a form of chemical analysis
 Freund's incomplete adjuvant, stimulant of the immune system
 Nobiin language (ISO 639-3 code fia)